Dana Michelle Plato (née Strain; November 7, 1964 – May 8, 1999) was an American actress. An influential "teen idol" of the late 1970s and early 1980s, Plato was recognized for her television work, for which she was included on VH1's list of "100 Greatest Kid Stars".

Plato was born to teen mother Linda Strain in 1964 and was adopted by Dean and Florine "Kay" Plato in 1965. She was raised in San Fernando Valley and was an accomplished figure skater before acting, having trained for the Olympic Games. Her acting career began with numerous commercial appearances, and her television debut came at the age of 10 with a brief appearance on the television series The Six Million Dollar Man (1975). Plato subsequently appeared in the horror films Exorcist II: The Heretic (1977) and Return to Boggy Creek (1977), playing Sandra Phalor and Evie Jo, respectively. 

Plato's breakthrough feature was the Academy Award-winning film California Suite (1978), in which she played Jenny Warren. She earned widespread recognition for playing the leading role of Kimberly Drummond, the daughter to investor Phillip and elder sister to adopted brothers Arnold and Willis Jackson, on the NBC/ABC sitcom Diff'rent Strokes (1978–1986). The role earned Plato acclaim, and nominations for a Young Artist Award for Best Young Actress in a Comedy Series and two TV Land Awards for Best Quintessential Non-Traditional Family. Following Diff'rent Strokes, she worked sporadically in independent film and B movies, and led the horror game Night Trap (1992) as Kelli Medd.

Plato married guitarist Lanny Lambert in 1984, with whom she had one child, Tyler; the couple divorced in 1990, and she thereafter married actor and producer Scott Atkins in 1996, which lasted one month. Her later struggles with substance abuse and mental health received significant media coverage, and her personal life, in retrospect, has been described as a "tragedy". 

On May 8, 1999, Plato was found dead from an overdose of prescription drugs at the age of 34, which was later ruled a suicide.

Early life 
Dana Plato was born Dana Michelle Strain on November 7, 1964, in Maywood, California, to Linda Strain, a teenager who was already caring for an 18-month-old child. In June 1965, the seven-month-old Dana was adopted by Dean Plato, who owned a trucking company, and his wife Florine "Kay" Plato. She was raised in the San Fernando Valley. When she was three, her adoptive parents divorced and she lived with her mother.

At a very young age, Plato began attending auditions with her mother, and at seven years old had appeared in over 100 television commercials. Plato was also an accomplished figure skater, and at one point trained for a possible Olympic team spot. During her years on Diff'rent Strokes, Plato struggled with drug and alcohol problems; she admitted to drinking alcohol, using cannabis and cocaine, and suffered an overdose of diazepam when she was aged 14.

In 1995, during an appearance on The Marilyn Kagen Show alongside co-star Todd Bridges, she spoke of her childhood with her mother, commenting how she had not learned "reality and life skills". Plato stated: "My mother made sure that I was normal. The only thing that she did, the mistake she made, was that she kept me in a plastic bubble. So, I didn't learn about reality and life skills." Kagen suggested that Plato may have been used for a free meal ticket, which Plato denied, explaining that her mother's ways were so that she would not become a prima donna.

Career 
Plato made her television acting debut at the age of 10, making a brief appearance on the NBC television show The Six Million Dollar Man. She then starred in the 1975 made for television film Beyond the Bermuda Triangle. Plato made her film debut at the age of 13, appearing as Sandra Phalor in the horror film Exorcist II: The Heretic (1977), for which she was uncredited, and also starred as Evie Joe in the horror film Return to Boggy Creek in the same year; both films were received negatively by critics. Better received was the family-comedy film California Suite (1978), in which Plato played Jenny Warren; the film was also a commercial success, and earned accolades from the Academy Awards and the Golden Globe Awards. 
 
When Plato made a brief appearance on The Gong Show, she was spotted by a producer who helped cast her as Kimberly Drummond—the older sister of adopted brothers Arnold and Willis Jackson—on the NBC sitcom Diff'rent Strokes. The series debuted in 1978 and became an immediate hit. Plato appeared regularly on the show throughout its run, notably top-billed for four years. She was nominated for a Young Artist Award for her work on the program, and also was part of two TV Land Award nominations given to its cast. In 1984, following the birth of her son Tyler, Plato was dismissed from her starring role due to both that and struggles in her personal life, which producers felt would negatively impact their "wholesome family comedy". She made a one episode appearance on season 8 episode 12 of "The Love Boat". Thereafter, Plato appeared recurringly on Diff'rent Strokes from 1985 to 1986, the show's end; in season 8, the episode which aired on January 17, 1986, was Plato's final appearance on the show, which showed her character suffering from bulimia. CBC News described her performance in the episode as a "series highpoint".

In 1981, Plato appeared in the television special A Step in Time, which earned her a second Young Artist Award nomination. In 1983, she starred in the television film High School U.S.A. as Cara Ames, alongside Diff'rent Strokes co-star Todd Bridges, who played Otto Lipton. In spite of the film being met with a mixed response from critics and viewers alike, it gained popularity at the time of its premiere, particularly for its cast. Plato attempted to establish herself as a serious actress but found it difficult to achieve success; she had breast implants and modeled for a June 1989 Playboy pictorial, and started taking roles in such B-movies as Bikini Beach Race (1989) and Lethal Cowboy (1992). In 1990 she made a brief attempt at a musical career, sponsored by producer Howie Rice. She recorded six tracks with songwriter/producer Daniel Liston Keller at Paramount Studios in Hollywood, CA, but the recordings were shelved and not released. 

In 1992, Plato starred in the video game Night Trap, becoming one of the first celebrities to appear in a video game. She was eager to work on the game, and Rob Fulop—one of the designers of Night Trap—said that he and Plato had enjoyed working together. She made little effort to hide the fact that the project was a step-down compared to her previous career ventures. The game was a moderate success, but is considered a pioneering title because it was the first to use live actors. Night Trap received mixed to negative reviews upon release, and in retrospective has continued to polarize critics and audiences. It is best remembered for the controversy it created over the violence and sexuality, along with that surrounding Mortal Kombat, which had eventually led to the creation of the Entertainment Software Rating Board (ESRB).

Toward the end of her career, Plato chose roles that were erotic; she appeared nude in Prime Suspect (1989) and Compelling Evidence (1995), and in the softcore erotic drama Different Strokes: The Story of Jack and Jill...and Jill (1998), the title of which was changed after filming in order to tie it to Plato's past. Following her appearance in the film, in the same year, Plato appeared in a cover story of the lesbian lifestyle-magazine Girlfriends.

Plato's last works include Desperation Boulevard (1998), in which she appears as herself and which appears to be based on her life; Silent Scream (1999), in which she appears as Emma Jones; and Pacino Is Missing (2002), which was released after her death, in which she appears as an attorney.

Personal life 
In December 1983, Plato moved in with her boyfriend, rock guitarist Lanny Lambert. The couple married on April 24, 1984, and their only child, Tyler Edward Lambert, was born on July 2, 1984. When it was revealed that she was pregnant, she was written out of Diff'rent Strokes. Her co-star Conrad Bain revealed that she was happy about her baby and that she would no longer be alone, stating in an interview with People magazine: "She deliberately got pregnant while doing the series, when I spoke to her about it, she was enthusiastic about having done that... [saying that] 'When I get the baby, I will never be alone again.'" On May 6, 2010, two days before the eleventh anniversary of Plato's death, her 25-year-old son Tyler died by suicide.

Plato separated from Lambert in January 1988, the same week her mother died of scleroderma. In desperation, she signed over power of attorney to an accountant who disappeared with the majority of her money, leaving her with less than $150,000. She claimed the accountant was never found nor prosecuted despite an exhaustive search, and that he had also stolen more than $11 million of other people's money. During her March 1990 divorce, Plato lost custody of her son to Lambert and was given visitation rights. She thereafter became engaged to Fred Potts, a filmmaker, but the romance ended. She was later married to actor and producer Scott Atkins (Scotty Gelt) in Vancouver for one month before the marriage was annulled. Before her death, Plato was engaged to her manager Robert Menchaca, with whom she lived in a motor home in Navarre, Florida.

On February 28, 1991, Plato entered a video store, produced a pellet gun, and demanded the money in the cash register. After she left with the money, the clerk called 9-1-1 and said, "I've just been robbed by the girl who played Kimberly on Diff'rent Strokes." Approximately fifteen minutes after the robbery, Plato returned to the scene and was immediately arrested. She had stolen $164. Entertainer Wayne Newton posted her $13,000 bail, and Plato was given five years' probation. She subsequently became a subject of the national debate surrounding troubled child stars, particularly given the difficulties of her Diff'rent Strokes co-stars Todd Bridges and Gary Coleman.

In January 1992, Plato was arrested a second time, for forging a prescription for diazepam. She served thirty days in jail for violating the terms of her probation and immediately entered a drug rehabilitation program. Plato later moved to Las Vegas, Nevada, where she struggled with poverty and unemployment. At one point she worked at a dry-cleaning store, where customers reported being impressed by her lack of airs.

On May 7, 1999, the day before she died, Plato appeared on The Howard Stern Show. She spoke about her life, discussing her financial problems and past run-ins with the law. She admitted to being a recovering alcoholic and drug addict, but claimed she had been sober for more than ten years by that point and was not using any drugs, with the exception of prescribed painkillers due to the recent extraction of her wisdom teeth. Many callers to the show insulted Plato and questioned her sobriety, which angered and provoked her, and she defiantly offered to take a drug test on the air. Some callers, as well as host Howard Stern, came to Plato's defense, though Stern also referred to himself as "an enabler" and sarcastically offered Plato drugs. Although she allowed a hair to be cut for the test, Stern later claimed she asked for it back after the interview.

Death 
On May 8, 1999, Plato and Menchaca were returning to California and stopped at Menchaca's mother's home in Moore, Oklahoma, for a Mother's Day visit. Later on in the visit, Plato said that she felt unwell and took a few doses of a hydrocodone / acetaminophen painkiller (Lortab), along with the muscle-relaxant carisoprodol (Soma), and went to lie down with Menchaca inside her Winnebago motor home, which was parked outside the house. Upon waking up, Menchaca and their family discovered that Plato had died in her sleep – initially assumed an accidental overdose but later ruled a suicide based on Plato's long history of substance use. Plato's body was cremated and her ashes were scattered over the Pacific Ocean.

In 2000, Fox broadcast a television movie based on Plato, titled After Diff'rent Strokes: When the Laughter Stopped. The film was focused on her life and work after the show, including her death. It featured actors who at the time were unknown, as well as Bridges, who made a cameo appearance. In 2006, NBC aired the television film Behind the Camera: The Unauthorized Story of Diff'rent Strokes, which was based on the lives of the child stars who had worked on the show. At the end of the film, where Bridges and Coleman appear, they stand near Plato's grave.

On May 6, 2010, her son, Tyler, died by suicide with a self-inflicted gunshot wound to the head, aged 25.

On November 7, 2019, on what would have been Plato's 55th birthday, Bridges commented on Twitter about their friendship, leaving a tribute to Plato: "You were the one person I could always talk to. You were one of my best friends. I will never forget you and love you forever. HAPPY BIRTHDAY Dana Plato R.I.P you are free my friend."

Filmography

Film

Television

Video games

Accolades

References

External links 

 
 
 Dana Plato on The Biography Channel first aired on December 29, 2007
 

1964 births
1999 deaths
1999 suicides
20th-century American actresses
Actresses from California
Actresses from Los Angeles County, California
American adoptees
American child actresses
American film actresses
American people convicted of drug offenses
American people convicted of robbery
American television actresses
American video game actresses
Drug-related deaths in Oklahoma
Drug-related suicides in Oklahoma
Female suicides
Forgers
People from Maywood, California
People from the San Fernando Valley